Adam Tepsurgayev (ca. 1976 — November 21, 2000) was a Chechen freelance cameraman who was shot and murdered in the village of  Alkhan-Kala, in Chechnya, Russia.

Career
Tepsurgayev began his career in journalism as a driver and a fixer for foreign journalists during the First Chechen War (1994–1996) between Russian troops and Chechen separatist guerrillas. Later he contributed to Reuters on an irregular basis and provided outlets with footage he shot from the front lines of the conflict. Reuters' shots of Chechen field commander Shamil Basayev having his foot amputated were taken by Tepsurgayev. Prior to his murder, Reuters had not published his work for six months. The Kremlin's Second Chechen War aide, Sergei Yastrzhembsky, commented that Tepsurgayev had not been accredited by the Russian authorities.

Death
Chechen-speaking masked gunmen shot him in the thigh and groin; he subsequently bled to death. Adam's brother Ali Tepsurgayev said that Adam had been killed as punishment for his work as a journalist. He himself was wounded in the leg during the attack.

Reactions
A Russian government spokesman blamed Chechen guerrillas for the murder, but local residents said the rebels had no reason to kill the cameraman.

References

External links
Hunt for journalists in today's Russia

1970s births
2000 deaths
Chechen journalists
Chechen murder victims
Deaths by firearm in Russia
Journalists killed while covering the Chechen wars
Russian war correspondents
People murdered in Russia
Russian people of Chechen descent
Chechen people
War photographers killed while covering military conflicts